is a Japanese advertising and public relations company. It is headquartered at Akasaka Biz Tower in Akasaka, Minato, Tokyo.

History 

Hakuhodo is one of the oldest advertising agencies in Japan and was founded by Hironao Seki at Nihonbashi-Honshiroganecho, Tokyo, as an advertising space broker and wholesale distributor for educational magazines in October 1895. 

In 1910 the company broke from its obscurity by contracting to place front page newspaper ads.

Their growth over the next few decades came from:
 1937 to 1944: grew by absorbing other agencies.
 1951: they created a radio advertising department
 1953: a TV group.

In 1996, Hakuhodo cofounded the DAC Consortium, a consolidated group of Japanese global media players investing in digital innovation.

In 2000, Hakuhodo created the joint-venture Hakuhodo-Percept with the Indian agency Percept to target the Indian advertising market. In December 2002, Hakuhodo launched the first advertising campaign where the Beckhams appeared together (displayed on billboard screens in Tokyo).

In October 2003 the company became part of the Hakuhodo DY Holdings after merging with other companies. Hakuhodo DY Holdings launched a unique media and entertainment company, Hakuhodo DY Media Partners Inc., in 2003. In February 2009, Hakuhodo announced a partnership with US global public relations firm Ketchum.

Hakuhodo acquired the US-based companies SYPartners LLC and Red Peak Group LLC in May 2014, the US-based marketing company Digital Kitchen in June 2015, the Montreal-based creative agency Sid Lee in July 2015, and the Singapore-based agency Integrated Communications Group (ICG) in February 2017. The Japanese company purchased 30% of Palo Alto-based IDEO in February 2016.

Description 

Hakuhodo has a large international footprint with offices in many major cities across Asia, Europe & the Americas
In Japan and in offices around the world.

Awards and recognition 

 1993: Grand Prix at the Cannes Lions International Festival of Creativity for Hungry? (client: Cup Noodles)
 2007: Silver Lion at the Cannes Lions International Festival of Creativity for Humanity (client: Toyota)
 2018: Silver Lion at the Cannes Lions International Festival of Creativity for Long Long Man (client: UHA Mikakuto)

References

External links

 Hakuhodo Inc. 

Advertising agencies of Japan
Japanese  companies established in 1895
Mass media companies of Japan
Mass media companies established in 1895